Pu'an County is a county of the Qianxinan Buyei and Miao Autonomous Prefecture in the southwest of Guizhou province, China.

Climate

Transportation
Pu'anxian railway station on the Shanghai–Kunming high-speed railway

References

External links

 
County-level divisions of Guizhou
Qianxinan Buyei and Miao Autonomous Prefecture